Neiked (stylised as NEIKED) is a Swedish artist collective of singers, songwriters and record producers. Victor Rådström and Mikael Rabus founded Neiked, a group that comprises rising artists, producers, writers and vocalists.

History
Rådström got his start writing songs in the basement of his home. Upon hearing his music, his friends were impressed by his creativity and encouraged him to reach out to various record labels in order to share his music with a larger audience. Impatient with the pace of the labels and with an eagerness to share the project with the world, Rådström and his friend and collaborator Rabus took matters into their own hands, formed the Neiked Collective, and released the music independently. The two of them are the founding parts of the independent label Neiked Collective. The collective has since appeared on shows such as BBC Live Lounge and on Scandinavian talk shows, showcasing the young producer's work in an unorthodox way.

Neiked's third single "Sexual" (2016) reached a peak position of number four on the Australian Singles Chart and number five on the UK Singles Chart. "Sexual" was influenced by Marvin Gaye's "Sexual Healing"; Rådström came up with the line "I'm feeling sexual so we should be sexual", with that thought forming the base of the song.

In 2018 they released the single "How Did I Find You" featuring Swedish singer and childhood friend Miriam Bryant, which features "a woozy, dusk-drenched pulse". Neiked released the single "Sometimes" in November 2019, which was called a "big and brassy declaration, [with] engaging production and west-coast warmth".

Neiked created the collaboration with Mae Muller and Polo G "Better Days" in 2021, a song which was a new entry at number 57 on the Billboard Hot 100 chart of October 30. "Better Days" also charted on the UK Singles Chart, debuting at number 52 on the chart of 4 November 2021 after accumulating a sales total of 8,007.

Discography

Albums
 Best of Hard Drive (2019)

Singles

Notes

References

Living people
1991 births
Swedish record producers